Víctor René Mendieta Ocampo (born 16 June 1961 in Panama City is a retired Panamanian football forward.

Club career
Mendieta played for local sides Plaza Amador, Sporting'89 and Tauro. He also had spells abroad in El Salvador, Ecuador, Honduras and, most notably, in Mexico during the 1994-95 season.

He announced his retirement in January 2000 after scoring 15 goals for Plaza Amador, but returned to play for Alianza and eventually retired in November 2001 after playing for Alianza against San Francisco, aged 40. According to the IFFHS, Mendieta scored 222 goals in 375 matches between 1978 and 1997.

International career
Mendieta made his debut for Panama in an October 1980 FIFA World Cup qualification match against El Salvador and has played 80 times  for the national team including unofficial matches during the 1980s and early 1990s. He represented his country in 16 FIFA World Cup qualification matches and played at the 1993 CONCACAF Gold Cup.

His final international was a September 2000 FIFA World Cup qualification match against Mexico.

Managerial career
Mendieta managed the Panama national under-20 football team at the FIFA U-20 World Cup in the Netherlands and he was named interim coach of the senior squad in 2006.

In 2009, he took charge of his former club Alianza and in May 2014 he was appointed manager of Independiente de La Chorrera, but was dismissed in October 2014.

Personal life
Mendieta is the father of former Panamanian international footballer Víctor René Mendieta.

International goals
Scores and results list Panama's goal tally first.

References

External links
 

1961 births
Living people
Sportspeople from Panama City
Association football forwards
Panamanian footballers
Panama international footballers
1993 UNCAF Nations Cup players
1993 CONCACAF Gold Cup players
C.D. Plaza Amador players
Sporting San Miguelito players
Correcaminos UAT footballers
Leones Negros UdeG footballers
Tampico Madero F.C. footballers
Real C.D. España players
Tauro F.C. players
Alianza Panama players
Panamanian expatriate footballers
Expatriate footballers in El Salvador
Expatriate footballers in Mexico
Expatriate footballers in Ecuador
Expatriate footballers in Honduras
Panamanian expatriate sportspeople in El Salvador
Panamanian expatriate sportspeople in Mexico
Panamanian expatriate sportspeople in Ecuador
Panamanian expatriate sportspeople in Honduras
Panamanian football managers
Panama national football team managers